Proto-Germanic paganism was the beliefs of the speakers of Proto-Germanic and includes topics such as the Germanic mythology, legendry, and folk beliefs of early Germanic culture. By way of the comparative method, Germanic philologists, a variety of historical linguist, have proposed reconstructions of entities, locations, and concepts with various levels of security in early Germanic folklore (reconstructions are indicated by the presence of an asterisk). The present article includes both reconstructed forms and proposed motifs from the early Germanic period.

Linguistic reconstructions can be obtained via comparison between the various Germanic languages, comparison with related words in other Indo-European languages, especially Celtic and Baltic, comparison with borrowings into neighbouring language families such as Uralic, or via a combination of those methods. This allows linguists to project some terms back to the Proto-Germanic period despite their attestation in only one Germanic language; for instance, *saidaz ('magic') is only attested in Old Norse seiðr, but has parallels in Proto-Celtic *soytos and Lithuanian saitas.

Deities

Entities

Locations

Other

See also
Anthropomorphic wooden cult figurines of Central and Northern Europe
Sacred trees and groves in Germanic paganism and mythology
Proto-Celtic paganism
Proto-Indo-Iranian paganism

Notes

References
 Ásgeir Blöndal Magnússon (1989). Íslensk orðsifjabók. Orðabók Háskólans.

 

European folklore